Kavach is an anti-missile naval decoy system to distract radar-guided missiles from their targets and act as a system for self-defence. It was designed and developed by the Ordnance Factory Board for the Indian Navy.

Development 
The Indian Navy previously procured chaff rocket systems from the Soviet Union. Supplies came to a halt following the dissolution of the Soviet Union in the early 1990s. The Ordnance Factory Board (OFB) took up the challenge to design and develop a chaff rocket system to achieve self-reliance in this field.  OFB Director General and Chairman, D.M. Gupta, stated in May 2011 that the company had created two prototypes, successfully conducted the first trial, and would conduct a second and final trial later that year before the system was inducted into the Navy.

Design 
The Kavach decoy system releases chaff made up of silver coated glass fiber. The chaff forms a clutter which remains suspended in the air, causing the incoming radar-guided missile to mistake the chaff for the actual target, and get locked onto the chaff instead of the actual target. Each Kavach rocket costs around –.

The Kavach system has chaff rockets of three different versions based on the range:
 Long Range: 
 Medium Range: 
 Short Range: 
These versions are fired in different situations based on incoming threats.

Production 
The first batch of Kavach rockets were formally handed over to the Navy on 25 May 2012 by the Ammunition Factory Khadki (AFK), Pune which manufactures the rockets, while the rocket launchers are manufactured at the Machine Tool Prototype Factory (MTPF), Mumbai.

AFK was contracted to deliver around 4,000 Kavach variants to the Indian Navy by 2015.

Operators
The first ship to be equipped with Kavach was the anti-submarine corvette INS Kamorta (P28). Ship classes fitted with Kavach include:

Kamorta-class corvettes
Kolkata-class destroyers
Shivalik-class frigates
Visakhapatnam-class destroyers

References

Weapons countermeasures
Indian Navy